The Gustav Adolf Church is a church building in Hamburg-Neustadt, Germany. It belongs to the Church of Sweden, and was built between 1906-1907.

References

External links

Church of Sweden in Hamburg

Church of Sweden churches
Lutheran churches in Hamburg
Buildings and structures in Hamburg-Mitte
Hamburg GustafAdolf
1907 establishments in Germany
20th-century churches in Germany